Susanto (born August 21, 1987) is an Indonesian footballer who currently plays for PSPS Pekanbaru in the Indonesia Super League.

Club statistics

References

External links

1987 births
Association football goalkeepers
Living people
Indonesian footballers
Liga 1 (Indonesia) players
PSPS Pekanbaru players